Rhodoneura nitens is a moth of the family Thyrididae first described by Arthur Gardiner Butler in 1887. It is found in Sri Lanka.

References

Moths of Asia
Moths described in 1887
Thyrididae